This is a list of North Texas Mean Green football players in the NFL Draft.

Key

Selections

References

North Texas

North Texas Mean Green NFL Draft